Stéphane Baudu (born 1 May 1956) is a French politician from the Democratic Movement. He was Member of Parliament for Loir-et-Cher's 1st constituency from 2018 to 2021.

Political career 
He was the substitute candidate for Marc Fesneau in the 2017 election.

In the 2021 departmental elections he was elected to the Departmental Council of Loir-et-Cher and had to resign from Parliament due to the dual mandate.

References 

Living people
1965 births
Democratic Movement (France) politicians
21st-century French politicians
Politicians from Centre-Val de Loire
Deputies of the 15th National Assembly of the French Fifth Republic

People from Blois